Stephenville Airport  is an airport located  south southeast of Stephenville, Newfoundland and Labrador, Canada. It was built by the United States Air Force and operated as Ernest Harmon Air Force Base from 1941 to 1966.

The airport serves not only the town of Stephenville, but the city of Corner Brook to the north, and as far south as Port aux Basques, making the total catchment approximately 100,000 people. This region is served through Stephenville Airport by frequent air ambulance flights and charter services.

The airport is classified as an airport of entry by Nav Canada and is staffed by the Canada Border Services Agency who are able to process general aviation with up to 30 passengers.

History
In 1941 the United States obtained rights to construct a United States Army Air Forces base in the St. George's Bay area of Newfoundland. The U.S. 76th Congress approved the 99-year lease and in April 1941, construction began.

The USAAF base was built as Stephenville Air Base. However, after the USAAF became the United States Air Force in 1947, it was renamed Ernest Harmon Air Force Base on June 23, 1948, in honour of Captain Ernest Emery Harmon. Harmon was a US Army Air Corps ace who was killed in an air crash in 1933.

On September 1, 1943, the Newfoundland Base Command transferred control of Harmon Field to the North Atlantic Wing, Air Transport Command. The base became a part of the Northeast Air Command in October, 1950. Then in April 1957, the Strategic Air Command assumed control.

The mandate of the base was to maintain a tanker alert force and its capability to meet and refuel Strategic Air Command jet bombers en route to targets. The Boeing KC-97 Stratofreighter was employed in this task.

The base was also used as a refueling stop for transatlantic military flights. In addition, Harmon supported three Air Defense Command units. In 1957, the Canadian Department of Transportation constructed an airport terminal to accommodate Trans-Canada Air Lines (now Air Canada). 1966 saw the closure of the U.S. Air Force Base in Stephenville.

The airport is now owned and operated by the local airport authority, the Stephenville Airport Corporation Inc. Stephenville Airport was designated as an alternate in the Trans Oceanic Plane Stop (TOPS) program on 23 July 1970.

Since the late 1990s, Stephenville has been designated as one of five Canadian airports suitable as an emergency landing site for the Space Shuttle.

The Stephenville Airport was the major passenger airport for all of western Newfoundland until the early 1990s when provincial government decided to direct more traffic to the Deer Lake Regional Airport. All major carriers used Stephenville such as Air Canada, Eastern Provincial Airways and Canadian Airlines.

In 1970 the airport was designated by international scheduled air transport and for international general aviation regular use.

In 2020, as a result of the COVID-19 pandemic, the airport suffered notable cuts to its airline routes. In August 2020, Winnipeg Airport Services Corp., a wholly owned subsidiary of Winnipeg Airports Authority, was contracted to provide airport management and safety management services for the Stephenville Airport.

Development plans
The Newfoundland and Labrador government along with the Stephenville Airport Corporation have jointly supported a new management structure at the airport. WASCO, a Winnipeg Airport management services firm, is currently managing the airport.

A route development committee has been formed to research and reach out to airlines that may serve the airport.  Currently the group is allegedly working with an interested airline to offer all year service within the Atlantic region and beyond, though this has not been confirmed.

Operation Yellow Ribbon
On September 11, 2001, eight civilian airliners made unscheduled landings at the Stephenville Airport following the closure of North American airspace in the wake of the terrorist attacks on New York City and Washington, D.C. As a participant in Operation Yellow Ribbon, the town hosted nearly 3,000 stranded passengers for approximately one week.

Airlines and destinations

Services

Budget Rent a Car
Discount Car Rental (off site) 
Eddy's bus service
 Islander's At the Airport restaurant
DRL Coachlines (passenger bus service to the rest of NL)
Airport check-in counter service
ATM
Ground transportation to and from hotels
Passenger lounge
Lav, water, ground power, stairs, air start and ground handling equipment available to service aircraft up to a Boeing 747

Alternate space shuttle landing site
Stephenville Airport was one of five sites along eastern North America designated as an alternate landing site for the Space Shuttle orbiter during its launches and landings. As of 2011 Space Shuttles are no longer in service.

References

External links
Airport website
Page about this airport on COPA's Places to Fly airport directory

Certified airports in Newfoundland and Labrador
Stephenville, Newfoundland and Labrador
Airfields of the United States Army Air Forces Air Transport Command on the North Atlantic Route